The 1852 United States presidential election in Illinois took place on November 2, 1852, as part of the 1852 United States presidential election. Voters chose 11 representatives, or electors to the Electoral College, who voted for President and Vice President.

Illinois voted for the Democratic candidate, Franklin Pierce, over Whig candidate Winfield Scott and Free Soil candidate John P. Hale. Pierce won Illinois by a margin of 10.10%. This is the last time that Lee County voted for the Democratic candidate.

Results

See also
 United States presidential elections in Illinois

References

Illinois
1852
1852 Illinois elections